Lars Erik Sødal (born 26 May 2002) is a Norwegian footballer who plays as a midfielder for Eliteserien club Viking FK.

Career
On 11 June 2020, he signed his first professional contract with Viking. In August 2021, he was loaned out to Egersund. In March 2022, he was loaned out to Sandnes Ulf.

Career statistics

References

External links

2002 births
Living people
Sportspeople from Stavanger
Norwegian footballers
Norway youth international footballers
Association football midfielders
Norwegian Second Division players
Norwegian First Division players

Egersunds IK players
Sandnes Ulf players
Viking FK players